Celestina Manga Besecu : ( Celestina; meaning Of the heavens; Heavenly.) is an Equatorial Guinean professional female footballer born on 12 September 2002 (age 20) who plays as a forward for Malabo Kings FC, an Equatorial Guinean women's football club based in the national capital Malabo. she also plays as a MF (No.8 ) for the Equatorial Guinea women's national team, nicknamed the Nzalang Femenino .

 birth and growing 
Celestina Manga Besecu's birthplace is Equatorial Guinea.

Nationality : Equatorial Guinea.

Celestina always loved playing football in her childhood which lead to her becoming a professional football player, which isn't an easy feat for a woman from poor origins in Equatorial Guinean

International career

 - JUNIOR CAREER 
At the age of 19 Manga represented the country at under-20 level at the 2019 African Games.

she started her career with FC super lonas and currently playing with  Malabo Kings FC since 2018

 -SENIOR CAREER Manga competed for Equatorial Guinea at the 2018 Africa Women Cup of Nations, playing in three matches.

she played for a total of 270 minutes, but her team suffered from bad results

a 0–5 defeat against Zambia 2018-11-18

a 1–7 defeat against South Africa 2018-11-21

a 0–6 defeat against Nigeria 2018-11-24 

and lost against Tunisia 7–3 in total in the Second round of the 2022 Africa Women Cup of Nations qualification Personal life Manga Besecu is a short player 160 cm and light weight which makes her maneuverable and hard to guard againstManga Besecu''' Leads a very healthy life outside and inside the field and takes care of her body and diet by lifting weight and running as well as attending her team's training seasons and is always in a good shape

References

External links

2002 births
Living people
Equatoguinean women's footballers
Equatorial Guinea women's international footballers
Women's association football midfielders
Competitors at the 2019 African Games
African Games competitors for Equatorial Guinea